The men's marathon event at the 2007 Pan American Games was held on July 29.

Results

References
Official results

Marathon
2007
Panamerican
2007
2007 Panamerican Games